The Biosphere, also known as the Montreal Biosphere, is a museum dedicated to the environment in Montreal, Quebec, Canada. It is housed in the former United States pavilion constructed for Expo 67 located within the grounds of Parc Jean-Drapeau on Saint Helen's Island. The museum's geodesic dome was designed by Buckminster Fuller.

History 
The structure was originally built as a component of EXPO 67, which officially opened on 27 April 1967.

The museum shows support for multiple causes by lighting up in different colors on special occasions. In April 2020, it lit up in multiple colors to show support during the Covid-19 pandemic. In June 2022, the museum lit up in green in support of World Environment Day.

1976 fire 
In the afternoon of 20 May 1976, during structural renovations, a fire burned away the building's transparent acrylic bubble, but the hard steel truss structure remained. The site remained closed until 1990.

In August 1990, Environment Canada purchased the site for $17.5 million to turn it into an interactive museum showcasing and exploring the water ecosystems of the Great Lakes-Saint Lawrence River regions.
The museum was inaugurated in 1995 as a water museum, and is a set of enclosed buildings designed by Éric Gauthier, inside the original steel skeleton. The Biosphère changed its name in 2007 to become an environment museum. It offers interactive activities and presents exhibitions about the major environmental issues related to water, climate change, air, ecotechnologies, and sustainable development.

Pavilion 
The museum is housed in the former pavilion built by the United States for Expo 67. The  architectural engineer of the geodesic dome was Buckminster Fuller. It is a Class 1 (icosahedral, as differentiated from Class 2 domes, which are dodecahedral, and Class 3 ones, which are tetrahedral), 32-frequency, double-layer dome, in which the inner and outer layers are connected by a latticework of struts. (There has occasionally been confusion in mistakenly referring to this as a 16-frequency dome due to the fact that there are 15 hexagonal polygons from each pentagonally polygonal vertex of this icosahedral polyhedron to the adjacent vertex. However, the standard for measuring dome frequency is the number of triangles from vertex to vertex. Since there are two triangles from one side to the opposite side of a hexagon, there are actually 30 triangles from the edge of each pentagonal vertex in this dome to the next, plus the triangle that comprises one-fifth of the pentagonal vertex at each end of the length from one vertex to the adjacent vertex: totaling 32 triangles from the center of each vertex to the center of the next vertex.)

A complex system of shades was used to control its internal temperature. The sun-shading system was an attempt by the architect to reflect the same biological processes that the human body relies on to maintain its internal temperature. Fuller's original idea for the geodesic dome was to incorporate "pores" into the enclosed system, further likening it to the sensitivity of human skin, but the shading system failed to work properly and was eventually disabled.

Architects from Golden Metak Productions designed the interior exhibition space. Visitors had access to four themed platforms divided into seven levels. The building included a  escalator, the longest ever built at the time. The Minirail monorail ran through the pavilion.  In 2021, The New York Times picked the dome as one of "the 25 Most Significant Works of Postwar Architecture".

In popular culture 
The structure was used prominently in the original Battlestar Galactica television series episode "Greetings from Earth". Scenes for Robert Altman's post-apocalyptic ice age film Quintet were shot on site as well.

The Biosphere appears in the 2003 animated Jacob Two-Two TV episode "Jacob Two-Two and the Notorious Knit Knapper", in which it is used as the headquarters for a group of seniors who plan on knitting a giant tea cosy to cover Montreal.

The Biosphere made an appearance during the finales of The Amazing Race: Family Edition and The Amazing Race Canada 4.

The Biosphere appears in the game Civilization VI (in the New Frontiers DLC) as a World Wonder, where it increases the appeal of marsh and rainforest tiles, and boosts power and tourism.

See also 
 Voice of Fire
 Biosphere
 Thin-shell structure
 List of thin shell structures

References

External links

 

Event venues established in 1980
Landmarks in Montreal
Biosphere
Buckminster Fuller
High-tech architecture
Geodesic domes
Expo 67
Rebuilt buildings and structures in Canada
Natural history museums in Canada
World's fair architecture in Montreal
Buildings and structures completed in 1967
Burned buildings and structures in Canada
Parc Jean-Drapeau
Museums established in 1990
1990 establishments in Quebec